The 2007 Interprovincial Hurling Championship was the 80th staging of the Interprovincial Championship since its establishment by the Gaelic Athletic Association in 1927. The championship began on 13 October 2007 and ended on 27 October 2007.

Leinster were the defending champions, however, they were beaten by Munster in the semi-final.

On 27 October 2007, Munster won the championship following a 2-22 to 2–19 defeat of Connacht in the final at Croke Park. This was their 44th championship title overall and their first title since 2005.

Munster's Eoin Kelly was the championship's top scorer with 1-20.

Teams

Results

Semi-finals

Final

Top scorers

Top scorers overall

References

Railway Cup Hurling Championship
Railway Cup Hurling Championship